Covert Action is an album by U.S. Bombs.

Line up for recording 

 Duane Peters- Vocals
 Kerry Martinez- Guitars
 Curt Stitch - guitar
 Jamie Reiding- Drums
 Wade Walston- Bass

Track listing 

 "Roll Around"
 "Shot Down"
 "Youth Goes"
 "Croatia Breaks"
 "Framed"
 "John Gotti"
 "The Gow"
 "Art Kills"
 "Lab Rats"
 "Majestic Twelve"
 "In & Out"
 "Faith Of Marie"
 "American Made"

References

U.S. Bombs albums
2003 albums